Akron Fulton Intl Airport  is in Akron, Summit County, Ohio, United States. It is owned by the City of Akron; FAA's National Plan of Integrated Airport Systems for 2011–2015 called it a general aviation airport.

Most U.S. airports use the same three-letter location identifier for the FAA and IATA, but Akron Executive is AKR to the FAA and AKC to the IATA (which assigned AKR to Akure, Nigeria).

History 
The airport was initially named for longtime manager Bain Ecarius "Shorty" Fulton and his son Bain J. "Bud" Fulton, it opened in 1929. Later it was a U.S. naval air station, Naval Air Station Akron. The airport has served only general aviation for many years, but it does technically have United States Immigration and Customs Enforcement facilities and so is considered an "international airport".

From 1951 through the 1960s the airport was used as a drag racing strip.

In 1985 the Akron Fulton International Airport was recognized as the 3rd National Landmark of Soaring by the National Soaring Museum.
On August 3, 2018, the City of Akron announced that the airport had been renamed Akron Executive Airport.

The Akron-Fulton International Airport Administration Building is on the National Register of Historic Places.

Facilities
Akron Fulton Intl Airport covers 1,171 acres (474 ha) at an elevation of 1,067 feet (325 m). It has one asphalt runway: 7/25 is 6,337 by 150 feet (1,932 x 46 m).

In the year ending August 26, 2010 the airport had 26,000 aircraft operations, average 71 per day: 99% general aviation, 1% air taxi, and <1% military. 74 aircraft were then based at the airport: 89% single-engine, 8% multi-engine, 1% jet and 1% helicopter.

The airport is supported by the local FBO (fixed-base operator) Summit Air, which fuels and hangars aircraft. North Coast Air Care has been based at the Akron Flight facility since May 2000. It maintains the general aviation community in performing inspections, maintenance and repairs to all aircraft from small Cessnas to corporate jets. In 2012 the owner of North Coast Air Care John Hogarth made an asset purchase of Summit Air, changing the name to Summit Airport Services LLC., and now offers full FBO services with aircraft maintenance, storage and fueling.

Accidents and incidents
10 November 2015: A Hawker 700 crashed into an Akron apartment complex shortly before 3:00pm (15:00) EST in rainy weather, near the intersection of Skelton and Mogadore Roads, while on approach to Akron Fulton International Airport. Witnesses reported hearing a loud explosion, and seeing smoke/flames as the crash occurred. All nine occupants of the aircraft, including both pilots, were killed in the crash. Akron police units were the first to report to the scene, followed shortly by firefighters and the Ohio State Highway Patrol. The National Transportation Safety Board dispatched an incident team to the site of the crash.
On July 4, 2022, a Cessna Skyhawk Cessna 172 flying from Chambers Airport in Tunkannock, Pennsylvania to Weltzien Skypark Airport crashed while attempting an emergency landing at Akron Fulton Intl Airport about a mile Northeast of the runway in Ellet Community Center parking lot. Both pilot and passenger survived the crash. Preliminary investigations suggest the crash was due to fuel exhaustion.

References

External links
 Akron Executive Airport website
 Shorty Fulton Collection from the Summit Memory Project
 Aerial image as of 30 September 2001 from USGS The National Map
 
 

Airports in Ohio
Transportation in Akron, Ohio
Gliding in the United States
Airports established in 1929
1929 establishments in Ohio